WAP four-disulfide core domain protein 5 is a protein that in humans is encoded by the WFDC5 gene.

This gene encodes a member of the WAP-type four-disulfide core (WFDC) domain family. Most WFDC proteins contain only one WFDC domain, and this encoded protein contains two WFDC domains. The WFDC domain, or WAP signature motif, contains eight cysteines forming four disulfide bonds at the core of the protein, and functions as a protease inhibitor. Most WFDC gene members are localized to chromosome 20q12-q13 in two clusters: centromeric and telomeric. This gene belongs to the centromeric cluster.

References

Further reading